Grigor Palikarov (Plovdiv; born in 1971) is a Bulgarian conductor, composer, pianist, and music educator.

Early life 
Palikarov studied at the Pancho Vladigerov National Academy of Music (Bulgarian State Conservatoire) where he received four master degrees in orchestral conducting, choir conducting, piano and composition as well as a doctoral degree in music, at which he was under the guidance such from teacher as Orchestral Conducting with Vassil Kazandzhiev and Ivan Voulpe, Composition with D. Tapkov, Piano with Kr. Tasskov and Choral Conducting with St. Kralev. Later on he continued his composition study during two Summer Academies in Austria with Erich Urbanner. He defended his Doctor of Music Degree in June 2017.

Career 
He debuted as an opera conductor in April 1994, at 22, with Verdi’s Rigoletto at two major opera houses in Bulgaria. He debuted at the National Opera and Ballet – Sofia in 1998, conducting the Gala Concert with the participation of Bulgarian opera singer Ghena Dimitrova† upon her personal invitation.

Later on he made many concerts and performances with other world famous opera singers such as Anna Tomowa-Sintow, Elena Obraztsova†, Krassimira Stoyanova, Ferruccio Furlanetto, Kurt Rydl, Alexandrina Milcheva, Nadia Krasteva and Nickola Giuzelev.

Palikarov works as a full-time conductor at the Sofia Opera and Ballet House. It includes more than 60 opera and ballet titles by Mozart, Rossini, Bellini, Donizetti, Weber, Verdi, Wagner, Ponchielli, Mascagni, Leoncavallo, Puccini, Gounod, Delibes, Bizet, Borodin, Rimsky–Korsakov, Tchaikovsky, Prokofiew, Orff, Bulgarian classical and contemporary composers. At the beginning of 2005/06 season Palikarov became managing and artistic director and conductor of the Pazardzhik Symphony Orchestra, and in September 2008 he became the principal conductor of Classic FM Symphony Orchestra.

Palikarov has performed with many soloists including members of Vienna Philharmonic: Albena Danailova (concertmaster), Wolfgang Schulz†, Franz Bartolomey, Dieter Flury, Robert Nagy, Glenn Dicterow (former concertmaster of New York Philharmonic and Svetlin Roussev (concertmaster of the French National Radio Orchestra).

Palikarov is a winner of many national and international piano and composition competitions. Some of his works were performed at music festivals and recorded at the National Radio - Sofia.

Guest conductor 
As a guest conductor Mr. Palikarov has performed in opera theatres, national festivals, international music festivals, concert halls Germany, Austria, Belgium (with the National Orchestra of Belgium), France, Italy, Luxemburg, Poland, Bulgaria, Portugal, Macedonia, Greece, Slovenia (with the National Opera and Ballet - Ljubljana), Romania, Switzerland, Taiwan (with Century Orchestra - Taipei), Russia (with State opera Krasnoyarsk), Ukraine, UK, USA (with Opera Circle - Cleveland), South Korea (with “Janacek” Philharmonic), Japan, Uruguay (with the National SODRE orchestra - Montevideo), Mexico (with UANL orchestra - Monterrey and Orquesta Sinfonica de Yucatan - Merida), China, etc.

Reviews
His US debut was mentioned by the critics there as "one of the most important musical events for year 2009 for Ohio State".

Recordings
Palikarov makes regular recordings of orchestral pieces, opera arias and ensembles as a guest conductor of the Symphony Orchestra of the Bulgarian National Radio.

Some of his recordings can be found on CDs and DVDs produced by different companies.

Others
Together with his conducting activities Mr. Palikarov composes music and performs as a piano soloist with orchestras in Bulgaria. He also leads the students’ orchestra at the National Academy of Music - Sofia.

Works(selections)
Choral-orchestral:

Cantata: Hodie Christus natus est for female voices choir and symphony orchestra (1995–97)

Symphony orchestra:

Concert piece for piano and orchestra (1998)

String orchestra:

Elegy (1995)

Chamber music:

Four Pieces for flute, French horn and double bass (version for bassoon and piano) (1997)
Piano Sonata (1994–95)

Choral music:

Mixed choir: Three Songs (1992-93) 
Three Psalms to Virgin Mary (1998–99)

References

External links 

 

1971 births
Living people
Bulgarian conductors (music)
21st-century conductors (music)